Chasmatophyllum is a genus of succulent plants native to the Karoo mountains of South Africa.

The genus contains eight accepted species:
Chasmatophyllum braunsii
Chasmatophyllum maninum
Chasmatophyllum musculinum
Chasmatophyllum nelli
Chasmatophyllum rouxii
Chasmatophyllum stanleyi
Chasmatophyllum verdoorniae
Chasmatophyllum willowmorense

The Red List of South African plants at the South African National Biodiversity Institute lists the conservation status of musculinum, nelli, stanleyi, and verdoorniae as being of least concern. The population of willowmorense is restricted in area, but stable, and there is insufficient information to assess the remaining three species.

References

Flora of South Africa
Aizoaceae
Aizoaceae genera